Friedrich Reindel (6 September 1824, in Werben (Elbe) – 27 September 1908, in Magdeburg) was Royal Prussian executioner from 1873 to 1898. Responsible for carrying out capital punishment in the Prussian provinces, he executed a total of 213 people by beheading with an axe.

Executioner
Executions in Prussia were carried out by members of the Reindel family, a "dynasty of executioners" from Werben (Elbe). Friedrich Reindel, younger brother of the executioner of the North German Confederation Wilhelm Reindel who had died in 1872, started his "career" in Braunschweig in 1873.

Popular European media showed ghoulish fascination with German executions, as with an illustration from Le Petit Parisien of the infamous executioner Reindel demonstrating his skill in Berlin Prison, 1891.

Friedrich Reindel retired in 1898, and his son Wilhelm had to resign in 1901 when, after continuous reports about his drunkenness and "feeble-minded" appearance at work, he was unable to cut off a victim's head with the first blow of his axe.

In 1900 Friedrich Reindel's son-in-law Alwin Engelhardt, a barman, who had assisted the family at a number of executions, also passed the examination set for Lorenz Schwietz and was officially approved as state executioner.

See also
List of executioners
Royal Prussian executioner Julius Krautz at de.wikipedia.org
Royal Prussian executioner Friedrich Reindel at de.wikipedia.org
Carl Gröpler

External links
 Dora Klages – Ein Raubmord erschütterte vor mehr als 100 Jahren die Bewohner der Heide.   
 Friedrich Reindel reiste durch den gesamten norddeutschen Raum, um Mörder mittels Handbeil oder Guillotine zu enthaupten

References

Bibliography
 Referring to Matthias Blazek, Scharfrichter in Preußen und im Deutschen Reich 1866–1945, Ibidem, Stuttgart 2010.

 Blazek, Matthias (2011): „Herr Staatsanwalt, das Urteil ist vollstreckt.“ Die Brüder Wilhelm und Friedrich Reindel: Scharfrichter im Dienste des Norddeutschen Bundes und Seiner Majestät 1843–1898. Ibidem, Stuttgart, .

German executioners
German memoirists
People from Magdeburg
1824 births
1908 deaths
German male non-fiction writers
19th-century memoirists